The 2017–18 South Florida Bulls men's basketball team represents the University of South Florida during the 2017–18 NCAA Division I men's basketball season. The season marks the 46th basketball season for USF, the fifth as a member of the American Athletic Conference, and the first season under head coach Brian Gregory. The Bulls play their home games at the USF Sun Dome on the university's Tampa, Florida campus. The Bulls finished the season 10–22, 3–15 in AAC play to finish in last place. As the No. 12 seed in the AAC tournament, they lost in the first round to Memphis.

Previous season
The Bulls finished the 2015–16 season 7–23, 1–17 in AAC play to finish in last place. As the No. 11 seed in the AAC tournament, they lost in the first round to UConn.

The Bulls were led by head coach Orlando Antigua for the first 13 games of the season until he was fired amid academic fraud allegations. Following Antigua's firing, they were led by interim head coach Murry Bartow. On March 14, 2017, the school hired Brian Gregory as the next head coach.

Offseason

Departures

Incoming transfers

2017 recruiting class

2018 recruiting class

Preseason
At the conference's annual media day, the Bulls were picked to finish last in the AAC.

Roster

Schedule and results

|-
!colspan=9 style=| Exhibition

|-
!colspan=9 style=| Non-conference regular season

|-
!colspan=6 style=| AAC regular season

|-
!colspan=9 style=| AAC tournament

References

South Florida Bulls men's basketball seasons
South Florida Bulls
South Florida Bulls men's b
South Florida Bulls men's b